Grand Ridge can refer to some places in the United States:

Grand Ridge, Florida
Grand Ridge, Illinois